Jacob ben Asher Zelig Psantir (6 June 1820 – 22 March 1901) was a Romanian Jewish musician and historical writer.

Biography
Jacob Psantir came from a once-affluent Jewish Moldavian family. His father, known as "Zelig the Frenchman," worked as an interpreter for Scarlat Callimachi, and later for the French consulate in Iași.

Psantir was orphaned at age 11, and received little formal education. Still, from his childhood he devoted himself to the study of music. He became a klezmer at age 13, and joined a Romani orchestra as a Lăutar. Psantir founded in Fălticeni a band of traveling Jewish and Romani musicians, with whom he performed across the Romanian Principalities, Bulgaria, Turkey, Crimea, and Bessarabia. 

During these years, he began to write a history of his family, but as he proceeded with it his ambition moved him to enlarge the scope of his work until it finally embraced the history of the Jews of Romania. For five years, though possessing very limited means, he traveled throughout Romania, visiting the cemeteries and studying the communal documents. The results of his labors were published in two works entitled Divre ha-Yamim la-Artzot Rumenye (Iași, 1871) and Korot ha-Yehudim be-Rumenye (Lemberg, 1873). In the former, Psantir claims the existence of a Jewish presence in Dacia from as early as the 6th century BC. A Romanian edition of both works was published at Bucharest in 1877. 

In 1875, Psantir published a memoir, entitled Sefer Zikhroynes (1875). He was the author also of Ha-Savlanut ha-Datit be-Romania, on religious tolerance in Romania, and Ha-Kosem, on popular magic.

Bibliography
 
 
 
 
  Introduction by Moses Gaster.

References
 

1820 births
1901 deaths
Jewish historians
Historians of Jews and Judaism
Jewish Romanian writers
Moldavian Jews
19th-century Romanian historians
Romanian historians of religion
19th-century Jews
Klezmer musicians
19th-century Romanian musicians
People from Botoșani
Lăutari and lăutărească music